The National Desk (TND) is a daily American television news program produced by the Sinclair Broadcast Group. The program premiered nationally on January 18, 2021, and utilizes the journalistic resources of Sinclair's news operations throughout the United States, as well as original content. It originates from the studios of flagship station WJLA-TV in the Washington, D.C. market.

History
In June 2020, Sinclair announced it would launch "a headline news service" that would air weekday mornings (6:00 AM – 9:00 AM local time) and rely on news-gathering services of Sinclair's stations as well as original content, similar in format to NewsNation Prime produced by Nexstar Media Group for NewsNation.

The program would be titled The National Desk, and Sinclair tapped veteran news anchor Jan Jeffcoat to host the program. It launched on January 18, 2021, and airs on Sinclair's CW and MyNetworkTV-affiliated stations, along with its Fox-affiliated stations without any local newscasts or news share agreements.

The National Desk largely replaced paid programming, televangelism, and syndicated programming on those stations, reportedly saving Sinclair money in the long-run. The morning block also served as the replacement for Sinclair's attempt at non-educational children's programming, KidsClick, which had ended two years before.

On May 4, 2021, Sinclair announced an evening expansion of The National Desk on September 27. The two-hour evening block airs after network primetime in the Eastern and Central time zones, while leading into it in the Mountain and Pacific time zones.

On November 15, 2021, ABC affiliate WATM-TV in Altoona, Pennsylvania will begin airing The National Desk in place of where local newscasts would normally air, making it among Sinclair's first "Big Three" affiliated stations to air The National Desk. Prior to this, it was airing a newscast produced from LMA partner WJAC-TV in nearby Johnstown, Pennsylvania. Another LMA sister station, Fox affiliate WWCP-TV in Johnstown, will air The National Desk during WATM-TV's network commitments with ABC.

A weekend edition of the program was launched on Saturday, March 5, 2022, anchored by Eugene Ramirez, who also anchors the live desk during the weekday evening edition.

Format
The National Desk is described by Sinclair as a "comprehensive, commentary-free" news program, despite Sinclair historically requiring its local stations to broadcast conservative opinion must-run segments. However, the program has been criticized by Media Matters for America for airing COVID-19 misinformation, inviting commentators from anti-immigrant organization FAIR, repeatedly airing a National Taxpayers Union falsehood regarding the cost of the INVEST in America Act, promoting efforts to counter inclusion of critical race theory in public schools, conducting interviews that propagated 2020 U.S. presidential election misinformation, and concealing interviewees' support of Republican efforts to restrict voting while discussing election security.

The program follows a similar format to NewsNation Prime, showing news stories from Sinclair stations on a national scale, as well as original content.  Unlike NewsNation Prime, the program was designed to air on Sinclair's local stations, giving the program a much wider availability than the cable-only NewsNation; additionally, the program airs on Sinclair's ad-supported streaming service Stirr, along with the live video section of nearly every Sinclair station site and app, allowing it national availability. The program does not air on Sinclair stations in every market due to network commitments.

Reception
The program gained notice at launch for having five times as many Twitter followers as NewsNation after its first week (compared to NewsNation, which had been on the air for five months). However, the social media accounts under "@Circa" had existed since 2012 for Sinclair's defunct Circa News service. That service was discontinued on March 26, 2019, with Sinclair keeping its existing social media accounts alive and repurposing them under the new "@TND" handle quietly two months later and building The National Desk concept around the dormant accounts, along with retaining most of the Circa-era follower base who had not stopped following the accounts. NewsNation in contrast had started fresh social media accounts, rather than transitioning its followers from those following it under the channel's former branding of WGN America.

References

Sinclair Broadcast Group
2020s American television news shows
2021 American television series debuts
English-language television shows
First-run syndicated television programs in the United States